Gompholobium pinnatum, commonly known as pinnate wedge-pea, is a species of flowering plant in the pea family Fabaceae and is endemic to eastern Australia. It is an ascending or erect shrub with pinnate leaves and yellow flowers with red marks.

Description

Taxonomy
Gompholobium pinnatum was first formally described in 1805 by James Edward Smith in Annals of Botany. The specific epithet (pinnatum) refers to the pinnate leaves.

Distribution and habitat
Pinnate wedge-pea grows in forest, woodland, heathland and shrubland, often in wet places and is widespread on the coast and nearby ranges of Queensland and New South Wales as far south as Jervis Bay.

References

pinnatum
Mirbelioids
Fabales of Australia
Flora of New South Wales
Plants described in 1805
Taxa named by James Edward Smith